Farouk Chanchoun (30 June 1955 – 19 April 2017) was an Iraqi boxer. He competed in the men's light welterweight event at the 1980 Summer Olympics.

References

1955 births
2017 deaths
Iraqi male boxers
Olympic boxers of Iraq
Boxers at the 1980 Summer Olympics
Place of birth missing
Asian Games medalists in boxing
Boxers at the 1974 Asian Games
Boxers at the 1978 Asian Games
Boxers at the 1982 Asian Games
Asian Games bronze medalists for Iraq
Medalists at the 1982 Asian Games
Light-welterweight boxers